The  is a Japanese people mover of Yamaman Co., Ltd., the developer of Yūkarigaoka town. The line, which opened in two stages between November 2, 1982, and September 22, 1983, runs from Yūkarigaoka Station and the entire route is in Sakura, Chiba. The line takes a rocket-shaped route as shown in the route diagram.

Stations list
All stations are located in Sakura, Chiba. Trains run in the order listed.

Buses
Since November 2020, Yamaman has established a bus department because the Yamaman Yukarigaoka Line has been difficult to use for elderly people who live in Yūkari-ga-Oka when moving around the vicinity and going shopping and so on. At first, Yamaman operated ここらら号 - Kokoara Gō as socialization experiment from 2013 to October 2020 for transportation poor people. So, now Yamaman Yūkari-ga-Oka Community Bus こあら号 - Koara Gō runs around Yamaman Yukarigaoka Line. And, the bus department of Yamaman has five routes, which you are able to ride on at flat rate of 200 yen (adult), 100 yen (child). The way of paying the fares is a face authentication. Vehicles are Hino Rainbow and Hino Poncho.

See also
List of rapid transit systems

References

External links
 Official website

Railway lines in Chiba Prefecture
People mover systems in Japan
Railway lines opened in 1982
1982 establishments in Japan